Fredson Câmara Pereira (born 22 February 1981), known simply as Fredson, is a Brazilian retired footballer who played as a midfielder.

Football career
Born in Monção, Maranhão, Fredson started his professional career with Paraná Clube in 1998, moving four years later to Spain after having signed with RCD Espanyol. At the Catalonia club he was never an undisputed starter, but received a significant amount of playing time, helping it to the Copa del Rey in his fourth season.

In January 2007, after having appeared in 117 official games for Espanyol over the course of four 1/2 La Liga seasons, Fredson moved on loan to São Paulo FC, where he sustained a severe knee injury. Upon his return he was deemed surplus to requirements by new boss Tintín Márquez, being sold in the 2008 summer to another Brazilian side, Goiás Esporte Clube.

For the 2010 campaign, Fredson joined modest Série A team Avaí Futebol Clube.

Honours
Paraná
Campeonato Brasileiro Série B: 2000

Espanyol
Copa del Rey: 2005–06

São Paulo
Campeonato Brasileiro Série A: 2007

References

External links

1981 births
Living people
Sportspeople from Maranhão
Brazilian footballers
Association football midfielders
Campeonato Brasileiro Série A players
Campeonato Brasileiro Série B players
Paraná Clube players
São Paulo FC players
Goiás Esporte Clube players
Avaí FC players
Vila Nova Futebol Clube players
La Liga players
RCD Espanyol footballers
Brazilian expatriate footballers
Expatriate footballers in Spain
Brazilian expatriate sportspeople in Spain